Below is an alphabetical list of every player that has played for the New York Mets of Major League Baseball since the franchise's inception in 1962. Included are the seasons in which they played for the Mets and their primary position(s).

Players in bold are members of the National Baseball Hall of Fame.

Players in italics have had their numbers retired by the team.

External links
 Baseball-databank.org
 Baseball-reference.com

Major League Baseball all-time rosters

Roster